The 1974 New South Wales Rugby Football League premiership was the 67th season of Sydney's professional rugby league football competition, Australia's first. Twelve teams, including six of 1908's foundation clubs and another six from across Sydney, competed for the J. J. Giltinan Shield during the season, which culminated in a grand final match for the WD & HO Wills Cup between the Eastern Suburbs and Canterbury-Bankstown clubs. This season NSWRFL teams also competed for the inaugural Amco Cup.

Season summary
The preseason saw Eastern Suburbs defeat South Sydney 43-0 in the final of the preseason competition at the Sydney Sports Ground, while Parramatta beat Cronulla 20-8 in the playoff for third at Belmore Oval.

This season the NSWRFL made the financial commitment to bring suburban football grounds up to a higher standard in order to take more games to the fans on a home-and-away basis.

Twenty-two regular season rounds were played from March until August, resulting in a top five of Eastern Suburbs, Manly-Warringah, Canterbury-Bankstown, Western Suburbs and Souths who battled it out in the finals. This season would mark the first time since 1950 where St. George failed to make the finals and the first time since 1911 that Balmain would finish last and take out the wooden spoon.

The 1974 Rothmans Medal was awarded to Manly-Warringah's fullback Graham Eadie. Rugby League Week awarded their player of the year award to Eastern Suburbs' forward Arthur Beetson.

Teams

Ladder

Finals

Chart

Grand final
“Master coach” Jack Gibson’s first title – and the Roosters’ first for twenty-nine years – was won by one of the most talented club teams in the Australian game’s history. In rugby union convert Russell Fairfax and giant threequarters Mark Harris and Bill Mullins, Easts had three attacking players who dominated Canterbury with their brilliance.

 Eastern Suburbs 19 (Tries: Beetson, Harris, Mullins. Goals: Peard 3, Brass 2.)

defeated

 Canterbury-Bankstown 4 (Goals: Cutler 2.)

Player statistics
The following statistics are as of the conclusion of Round 22.

Top 5 point scorers

Top 5 try scorers

Top 5 goal scorers

References

External links
Rugby League Tables – Season 1974
Results:1971-80 at rabbitohs.com.au
1974 J J Giltinan Shield and WD & HO Wills Cup at rleague.com
NSWRFL season 1974
‘Souths lose centre, five-eighth’; Sun-Herald, 1 September 1974, p. 48

NSWRFL season
New South Wales Rugby League premiership